Brachylaelaps is a genus of mites in the family Neoparasitidae.

This genus was formerly in the family Pachylaelapidae.

References

Pachylaelapidae
Articles created by Qbugbot